The Strongman Champions League is a strongman competition circuit, with several Grand Prix events throughout the year and the Strongman Champions League overall champion title going to the overall winner at the end of the season. The competitors include some of the top athletes in the sport, including Žydrūnas Savickas, Hafþór Júlíus Björnsson, Krzysztof Radzikowski, Travis Ortmayer, Nick Best, Mikhail Koklyaev, Ervin Katona, Andrus Murumets, Laurence Shahlaei, Vytautas Lalas and Terry Hollands. Initially in close partnership with IFSA, it quickly asserted its independence and has acted as a unifying force in the world of strength athletics, bringing together athletes from IFSA with those affiliated to the World's Strongest Man circuit, and having close cooperation with other major events such as Fortissimus. In 2012, SCL began co-promoting the new Arnold Strongman Classic-Europe contest which will become part of the annual SCL season of events.

History

The Strongman Champions League was developed by Ilkka Kinnunen and Marcel Mostert, longtime strongman promoters, with major contests to their credit worldwide, and was launched in 2008. Kinnunen & Mostert described SCL as "a new episode in strongman".

"A complete series of 10–12 competitions, that will take place all over the world, but most of the competitions will be held in Europe. The very best champions, referees and their organizers will be the guarantee of a great new, fresh excitement in Strongman sport. The competition venues are the best which each country can offer and it will include the country's own traditional elements." As well as citing that all points will be accumulated for a Champions League Winner at the end of the year, it was stated in the main structure of the Champions League that rules will be done officially as usual in all IFSA competitions and that the top 3 will be directly placed in the IFSA World Championships. Mostert also said "All together we think that this is a perfect platform of competitions that will lead to another great World Championship."

Thus, IFSA were inextricably linked at the inception of the league. IFSA, however, were in reportedly dire financial straits towards the end of that year. By December, Mostert distanced the league from the ailing governing body and explicitly said that the "Strongman Champions League had nothing to do with IFSA". He told IronMind "We have our own logo, we have our own brand, we do our own competitions." Its own website was launched shortly afterwards.

The league organizers had originally reported that the Champions League competitions will be televised and spread all over the world. In the harsh economic climate of 2008, the league was not immune to the effects, and the league did have to cancel some venues, but unlike with the IFSA, the vast majority of the competitions still took place. In 2008, the SCL had 45 top strength athletes competing, representing more than 20 countries.

Fortissimus Cooperation
In 2008, Paul Ohl stated that the Strongman Champions League was one of three organizations that had made an agreement with Fortissimus in order to unite the world strength community, the others being the American Strongman Corporation and the Aussiepower organization. Within the agreement, Fortissimus, the competition that confers the title of "Strongest Man on the Planet", guaranteed that the winner of the America's Strongest Man title would be granted a slot in Fortissimus from 2009, as would the winner of the Australia's Strongest Man title. The agreement with the Strongman Champions League went further, stating that the top three athletes would have guaranteed places and in return, the top Canadian athletes would have guaranteed selected participation in the Champions League. This later went further, guaranteeing the SCL its top five athletes would have places. The agreement was reemphasised in a joint statement from Marcel Mostert and Paul Ohl in early 2009.

2009 and links with World's Strongest Man
The 2009 programme was planned with ten major contests on schedule. In addition, feeder contests were introduced, one happening in Spain in December 2008 and a further event in Germany called the FIBO Strongman Classic in April 2009. The best two athletes from this FIBO Classic 2009 edition were guaranteed into the Champions League, and it was postulated that this German event would be promoted to full SCL status in 2010.

The Strongman Champions League importantly made further progress in acting as a fundamental part of a unifying movement for world strength athletics by making plans to help get its athletes to the 2009 World's Strongest Man contest. Mostert stated that "The top 5 SCL athletes will have places in the Giants Live tour for qualifying at World's Strongest Man (WSM) 2009". In addition, he also stated that wild cards for the WSM will include SCL athletes. He went on to say that "Finally we made it all possible again that all the athletes have chances to qualify for the WSM, which means in my opinion the WSM will have the strongest field ever in her history!". He went on to thank TWI/IMG and Giants Live for their part in making these possibilities. This was groundbreaking because for a number of years prior to this, the athletes under the IFSA had been banned by the federation from entering WSM (since the IFSA fell out of favour with TWI). Likewise, the athletes invited to participate in WSM were not invited to participate in IFSA events. Some competitions bridged the divide, such as the Arnold Strongman Classic and more recently Fortissimus, but neither had the history, gravitas, or popular appeal of the World's Strongest Man. The IFSA athletes, with the demise of the IFSA finances, almost all competed in SCL from 2008. This deal, along with the Fortissimus deal before it, united strongman in a way it had not been since 2004.

The 2009 season began properly on 9 May, with the Strongman Champions League Serbia. Finland followed on 16 May, with Slovakia and the Netherlands in June.

Results

List of SCL Season Champions

2008

2009

2009 Qualifiers
The Strongman Champions League introduced qualifying competitions for 2009. From these competitions, the top two were guaranteed places in the SCL. The first qualifier was held in Los Barrios, Spain. The second was the FIBO Classic in Germany.

2010

2011

2012

2013

2014

2015

SCL North American Championships
In 2012, SCL announced the first ever SCL North American Championships to be held in Warwick, Quebec from 5–8 July 2012. The contest took place over 4 days and consisted of 10 events, with athletes from USA and Canada, with 5 athletes from each country. The event was organized by SCL in association with the Festival Hommes Forts-Warwick along with co-organizer Jean Fréchette. The event also featured an amateur, semi-pro and a strongwoman competition.

2012
Dates: 5–8 July 2012
 Warwick, Quebec

2013
Dates: 5–7 July 2013
 Warwick, Quebec

2014
Dates: 4–6 July 2014
 Warwick, Quebec

105kg Strongman World Championships

World Log Lift Championships

References

External links

Strongmen competitions